The Bishops-Assistant at the Pontifical Throne were ecclesiastical titles in the Roman Catholic Church. It designated prelates belonging to the Papal Chapel, who stood near the throne of the Pope at solemn functions. They ranked immediately below the College of Cardinals and were also Counts of the Apostolic Palace. Assistants at the Pontifical Throne, unless specifically exempted, immediately enter the Papal nobility as Counts of Rome.

Pope Paul VI ended the use of this and similar titles of nobility in 1968.

History
All patriarchs and some bishops selected by the Pope, were made Assistants at the Pontifical Throne.

On 22 May 1862, during the canonization ceremony of the twenty-six Catholic martyrs of Japan, Pope Pius IX elevated all the bishops present to the rank of Assistant at the Pontifical Throne. 
On 8 January 1866, Ruggero Luigi Emidio Antici Mattei was named Dean of the Assistants at the Pontifical Throne after Pope Pius IX named him Latin Patriarch of Constantinople.
On 17 June 1867, during the 1800th anniversary of the martyrdom of Saints Peter and Paul, Pope Pius IX elevated all the bishops present to the rank of Assistant at the Pontifical Throne.

The title has not been in use since Pope Paul VI reformed the Pontifical Household. On 28 March 1968, he issued Pontificalis Domus, which renamed the Papal Court the Papal Household and eliminated all titles of nobility.

See also
Prince Assistants to the Papal Throne

References

New Catholic Dictionary

External links
 Cardinal Antici Mattei as Dean of the Assistants to the Pontifical Throne

Catholic ecclesiastical titles
Honorary titles of the Holy See
Papal household